Pseudorhabdosynochus justinella is a diplectanid monogenean parasitic on the gills of the red grouper, Epinephelus morio. It has been described by Kritsky, Bakenhaster and Adams in 2015.

The specific name justinella is in honor of parasitologist Jean-Lou Justine from National Museum of Natural History in France.

Description
Pseudorhabdosynochus justinella is a small monogenean. The species has the general characteristics of other species of Pseudorhabdosynochus, with a flat body and a posterior haptor, which is the organ by which the monogenean attaches itself to the gill of is host. The haptor bears two squamodiscs, one ventral and one dorsal.
The sclerotized male copulatory organ, or "quadriloculate organ", has the shape of a bean with four internal chambers, as in other species of Pseudorhabdosynochus.
The vagina includes a sclerotized part, which is a complex structure.

The description by Kritsky, Bakenhaster & Adams in 2015 includes the following:

Diagnosis
Kritsky, Bakenhaster & Adams (2015) wrote that "examination of the holotype, three paratypes, and voucher specimens from red grouper off Florida and Mississippi indicated that the original description of P. yucatanensis Vidal-Martínez, Aguirre-Macedo & Mendoza-Franco, 1997 was based on specimens representing two distinct species of Pseudorhabdosynochus", namely P. yucatanensis sensu stricto and a new species, P. justinella Kritsky, Bakenhaster & Adams, 2015.

According to Kritsky, Bakenhaster & Adams (2015), P. justinella is most similar to P. woodi Kritsky, Bakenhaster & Adams, 2015 based on the comparative morphology of the vaginal sclerite, the ventral bar, and the ventral and dorsal anchors. In both species, the vaginal sclerite possesses an elongate sigmoid distal tube attached to the distal end of the chamber, the ventral bar is short and robust, the deep root of the ventral anchor is shorter than the superficial root, and the dorsal anchors of the two species are morphologically indistinguishable. P. justinella differs from P. woodi by having a vaginal sclerite with a larger (~20 μm in diameter) subspherical chamber (vaginal sclerite with a small [~10 μm in length] ovate chamber in P. woodi).

Hosts and localities
The type-host and only recorded host is the Red grouper, Epinephelus morio (Serranidae: Epinephelinae). The type-locality is Florida Middle Grounds, Gulf of Mexico. Other localities are Gulf of Mexico (an area off Mississippi with numerous artificial reefs) and Progreso, Yucatan State, Mexico (as P. yucatanensis).

References
This article incorporates CC-BY-4.0 text from the reference

Diplectanidae
Animals described in 2015